Xiangkou is a town located in the Wulong District of Chongqing, China.

References

Township-level divisions of Chongqing
Towns in Chongqing